The 2011–12 TFF Second League (also known as Spor-Toto Second League due to sponsorship reasons) is the 11th season of the league since its establishment in 2001 as the third level division; and the 49th season of the second league in Turkish football since its establishment in 1963–64 (before 2001 league was played as second level division). The start date of the league is 4 September 2011 and end date is 20 May 2012.

League is played with 34 teams, 17 in White group and 17 in Red group. Winner of each group promote to 2012–13 TFF First League. A play off series are played among best four teams in each group to determine the third team to promote. Bottom three teams in each groups relegated to 2012–13 TFF Third League.

Teams
Altay and Diyarbakırspor were relegated from 2010–11 TFF First League. Altınordu, Denizli Bel., Gaziosmanpaşaspor, Kırklarelispor, Tepecikspor, Ünyespor were promoted from 2010–11 TFF Third League

Team summaries

White Group

White Group league table

White Group positions by round

Red Group

Red Group league table

Red Group positions by round

Promotion playoffs
All matches were played at Denizli Atatürk Stadium.

Quarterfinals

Semifinals

Final

See also
 2011–12 Turkish Cup
 2011–12 Süper Lig
 2011–12 TFF First League
 2011–12 TFF Third League

References

TFF Second League seasons
3
Turkey